Bhagautipur is a village in Salarpur block, Budaun district, Uttar Pradesh, India. Its village code is 	128327. Budaun railway station is 5 KM away from the village. The village is administrated by Gram Panchayat. The major caste of residing people in the village is Kurmi.

References

Villages in Budaun district